Helene Moltke-Leth (born 1973 in Copenhagen) is a Danish film director, artist and former DJ working across film, photography, sound, music and fine art.  She graduated from The National Film School of Denmark in 2005 and has received nine international film awards. Her work has been shown at museums and international film, art and poetry festivals including Tokyo Photographic Art Museum, Ann Arbor Film Festival, Berkshire International Film Festival, Copenhagen International Documentary Film Festival and Odense International Film Festival. She also serves as a jury member for a film festivals.

Life and career 
Helene Moltke-Leth was born in 1973 in Copenhagen, Denmark. In the 1990s, she worked as a DJ, radio and TV presenter for The Danish Broadcasting Corporation and TV2 Denmark, hosting the music programs P3 GO!, Uland and Puls. She interviewed electronic DJs and artists such as Underworld, Prodigy, Chemical Brothers, The Goodiepal, Moby, DJ Sneak, Kenny Larkin, David Holmes, Matthew Herbert, Patrick Pulsinger and Erdem Tunika. In 1996 she co-founded the nightclub Klub Vega, and is recognised as being one of Denmark's first female DJs and a prominent figure in the early rise of the electronic music scene.

In 2005 she graduated from The National Film School of Denmark.

Her work within music and poetry includes the documentary 'Underworld' about the British electronic music group's Beaucoup Fish tour, and the documentary ”Roskilde,” which she co-directed with Ulrik Wivel. Her music documentary ”Same Old Song” follows three Danish musicians, Tue Track, Mikkel Hess and Joy Morgan, who created a love song while exploring what it meant to be single at the start of the millennium. In 2006 she made 5 short poetry films with Danish poets Mette Moestrup, Maja Lee Langvad, Hans Lucht, Marie Mamonia og Lasse Thorning which was broadcast on The Danish Broadcasting Corporation and presented at several nordic film festivals. In 2007, she received the Best Short Fiction Award at Odense international Film Festival for the short poetry film ”Sporenstregs" featuring Danish poet Lasse Thorning. Her short poetry film ”Beyond Words” received the Special Merits at the Faces of Wisdom Short Film Competition in 2014. The film included a poem by Else Beyer Knuth-Winterfeldt. In 2016, she created the short poetry film ”Running Through Life.” It received six international awards in Asia, USA and Europe including Best Short Award (Minister's Award, the Ministry of Environment) and the J-WAVE Award, at Short Shorts Film Festival & Asia, Japan, 2016 and The Next Great Filmmaker Award, at Berkshire International Film Festival, in 2017. The short film ”Running Through Life” was also shown at the opening of the sustainability conference Copenhagen Fashion Summit in 2016. The film was a meditation on the limitations of modern society. In 2022, her short climate art film ‘I C’ received the Best Experimental Film Award at Manchester Film Festival. She was in 2022 jury member for the 60Seconds Festival, celebrating silent artistic films in public spaces.

Her first solo exhibition ‘Who or What is God Now?’ was shown at DGI-byen in Copenhagen and included eight abstract photographs of nature that portrayed fragments of the rainbow. The exhibition addressed the positive symbolism of the rainbow and was a comment on climate change.

Earlier in her career she worked within portrait documentaries, and directed ”I Danmark, dér hører jeg hjemme” which portrayed the life of Isi Foighel, former Danish minister and judge at the European Court of Human Rights. She directed the TV-documentary ”Opgøret med fortiden” and six episodes of the TV-documentary series ”Meningen med livet og andre småting.” She created ten short films featuring key players in the Danish fashion industry in 2007. The films were shown on large outdoor screens around the city during Copenhagen Fashion Week, and included interviews with Naja Lauf, E-Types, Diana Brinks, Designers Remix, Ole Yde, Day Birger et Mikkelsen, Gestuz, Unique Models, Dyrberg/Kern and Kaffe Clothing. In 2022 she collaborated with fashion designer Henrik Vibskov on the short poetry film ‘Bibliotheca of Micro Selves’ which was shown at Paris Fashion Week.

Awards 
Moltke-Leth has been nominated for a number of awards and she has won nine international prizes:

 ‘I C’, Best Experimental Film, Manchester Film Festival, United Kingdom, 2022 
 ‘Running Through Life’, The Next Great Filmmaker Award, Berkshire International Film Festival, US, 2017
 ‘Running Through Life’, Best Experimental Film, Manchester Film Festival, United Kingdom, 2017
 ‘Running Through Life’, The Audience Award, Be a Better Being, Germany, 2016
 ‘Running Through Life’, International Public's Selection Award, Festival Silêncio, Portugal, 2016
 ‘Running Through Life’, Best Short Award (Minister's Award, the Ministry of Environment), Short Shorts Film Festival & Asia, Japan, 2016
 ‘Running Through Life’, J-WAVE Award, Short Shorts Film Festival & Asia 2016, Japan, 2016
 ‘Beyond Words’, Special Merits, Faces of Wisdom Film, 2014
 ‘Sporenstregs’, Best Danish Short Fiction, Odense International Film Festival, Denmark, 2007

See also 

 List of Danish artists
 Helene Moltke-Leth (in Danish)
 Vimeo trailers - Helene Moltke-Leth

References 

1973 births
Living people